Harry and Valter Moberg were twin brothers that specialized in the construction and restoration of old organs in churches across Scandinavia.

Background 
The twin brothers were born in Sandviken, Sweden on March 5, 1915. Their parents, Engelbert and Alida Moberg, had musical interests and played a variety of instruments. Their older sibling Elsa, an educated pianist, was married to violinist John Vesterlund, who began organ building in the 1930s and allowed the Moberg brothers to learn from him. In 1933, Vesterlund's company began restoration work on an organ in Løvstabruk, built by Johan Niclas Cahman in 1728. The experience influenced the brothers' interest in historical organs. They met the organ historians Bertil Wester and later Einar Erici who were particularly interested in the mapping of old organs in Sweden.

The Moberg brothers started their own organ building company in 1941, becoming pioneers in restoring organs with historic value in Sweden. There were about 4000 organs in Sweden by 1950 having grown from 30 when record keeping began in the 1600s, 200 of which were classified as historically valuable by the Swedish National Heritage Board. With their co-worker Ville Pettersson, they have restored about 90 historical organs across Scandinavia together. Among their most famous works is the restoration of the organ at Åtvid's old church built by Jonas Wistenius in 1751, which was reconstructed to 70 percent. Albert Schweitzer has played on the restored organ and expressed his opinion positively about the reconstruction. The organ in Seglora church in Skansen, Stockholm was restored in 1963. The organ was built by Jonas Ekengren in 1777. The organ in Tjällmo church, built by Isac Risberg 1710, was restored in 1968.

The brothers recorded the sound of several historic organs and filmed several of their restorations. They also published articles in Church Musicians Magazine and Organ forums.

The work of the Moberg brothers was carried out on the basis of their conservation idea: "The purpose of preserving old church organs is to produce a complete line of organs from past time, where each preserved organ work must be a silent representative of its era and show as much as possible its master's personal and artistic characteristic, such as they were at the time of construction."

They documented all of their restorations and other major works with photographs and explanatory text about the performed works.

Their archives are currently available at the Swedish National Heritage Board in Stockholm.

Works

Sweden

Norway

Finland

Constructions

Films

Sound Recordings

References 

The Brothers Moberg Archive, National Archives of Sweden
The Brothers Moberg page on the National Archives of Sweden
The Wistenius Organ built in 1751 in the Old Church in Aatvidaberg, restored by the Brothers Moberg

Swedish music history